The Alvear Palace Hotel is a luxury hotel located in Avenida Alvear in Recoleta, an upscale neighbourhood in Buenos Aires, Argentina. The hotel was inaugurated in 1932 and, following extensive refurbishment, was reinaugurated in 1994.

History
The hotel was built by Buenos Aires businessman and socialite Dr. Rafael de Miero, who had been to Paris in the early 1920s and wanted to bring some of that Belle Epoque grandeur to his then flourishing hometown.

He bought and demolished a large house on the corner of Avenida Alvear and Ayacucho in 1922, which began the decade-long on-again, off-again project, which finally opened in 1932. A success, it was expanded in 1940, consuming another old mansion on Avenida Alvear.

In 1970, ownership passed to the 26-year-old Andreas von Salm-Kyrburg Wernitz, Duke of Hornes, Spanish cousin of King Juan Carlos I, who presided over the hotel's slow decline as a result of labour disputes and a general Argentinian economic stagnation. With bankruptcy threatening, in 1978 Wernitz sold the hotel to the Aragon Hotel Group, and since 1984, it's been part of David Sutton Dabbah's Alvear Luxury Hotels.

It was renovated in 1984, and again in 2004.

Anecdotes
 In 1948 Prince Aimone, Duke of Aosta died in the hotel.
 In 1962 the actor Tony Curtis and his family (Janet Leigh, Kelly Curtis, Jamie Lee Curtis) stayed in room 606 during the filming of Taras Bulba.
 In 1964 in room 805, the actress Juliette Mayniel tried to commit suicide when she learned that her husband Vittorio Gassman was deceiving her. A hotel employee saved her just in time.
 On May 4, 1992, the Swedish music group Roxette recorded the songs "Here Comes the Weekend" and "So Far Away" in the room 603, which were included in the album Tourism.
 Christina Onassis bought suite 334 only to speak on the phone during her frequent stays in Buenos Aires.
 Horacio Ferrer Lived in the hotel for 38 years until his death in 2014.

In Media
 The 1964 movie Il Gaucho, was filmed largely in the hotel.
 The 1995 movie The Things of Love, Part II, from the director Jaime Chávarri has scenes filmed in the hotel.
 In 2009 the hotel was featured in the movie Walt & El Grupo, about when Walt Disney came to South America in 1942.

Notable guests

 Ted Turner
 Arthur Miller
 David Em
 Jacques Chirac
 Antonio Banderas
 Sharon Stone
 Melanie Griffith
 Sean Connery
 Gina Lollobrigida
 Kenzo
 Akihito and Michiko
 Michael Schumacher
 Al Pacino
 Alain Delon
 Marcello Mastroianni
 Catherine Deneuve
 Salma Hayek
 Juan Carlos I of Spain and Queen Sofía of Spain
 Alan Parker
 Carolina Herrera
 Beatrix of the Netherlands
 Willem-Alexander of the Netherlands and Máxima of the Netherlands
 Wim Wenders
 Nelson Mandela
 Sofia Loren
 Helmut Kohl
 Walt Disney
 Rafael Alberti
 Fidel Castro
 Shaquille O'Neal
 Francis Ford Coppola
 Karl Lagerfeld
 Claudia Schiffer
 Rod Stewart
 John Malkovich
 Tom Cruise
 Omar Sharif
 Muhammad Ali
 Margrethe II of Denmark
 Prince Aimone, Duke of Aosta
 Orson Welles
 Isabelle Huppert
 Harald V of Norway and Queen Sonja of Norway
 Vladimir Putin
 Angela Merkel
 Martti Ahtisaari
 Mario Vargas Llosa
 Charles, Prince of Wales
 B.B. King
 Alvin Toffler
 Daniel Barenboim
 Jane Fonda
 Roxette

References

External links
Alvaer Palace Hotel Site

Hotels in Buenos Aires
Hotel buildings completed in 1932